Saul Goodman is a fictional lawyer in the TV drama Breaking Bad and Better Call Saul.

Saul Goodman may also refer to:

 Saul Goodman (percussionist) (1907–1996), of the New York Philharmonic
 Saul Goodman, a fictional detective in the 1975 novels The Illuminatus! Trilogy

See also
 Saul (disambiguation)
 Goodman (disambiguation)